Teimuraz I (T'eimuraz I Mukhranbatoni) (16 July 1572 – 1 July 1625) was a Georgian tavadi ("prince") of the House of Mukhrani, a collateral branch of the royal Bagrationi dynasty of Kartli, and Prince (Mukhranbatoni) of Mukhrani from 1580 until his death. At the same time, he was an ex officio commander of the Banner of Shida Kartli and regent of Kartli, from 1623 to 1625, during the rebellion against Safavid Iran. Teimuraz was killed at the battle of Marabda against the Iranian punitive army.

Early life 
Teimuraz was the eldest son of Vakhtang I by his wife, Khvaramze. Vakhtang's other known sons were Kaikhosro (died 3 October 1629) and Bagrat (born 16 July 1572). According to Cyril Toumanoff's hypothesis, Teimuraz and Bagrat were the same person, the latter being a name adopted by the prince on his accession to the lordship of Mukhrani. When his father died in 1580, the lordship of Mukhrani passed to the late prince's nephew and Teimuraz's uncle, Erekle I (died 1605), apparently, in the capacity of a regent for the underage Prince Teimuraz. During this period of time, Kartli was a battleground between the rivaling Muslim empires, the Ottomans and the Safavids. In 1582, Mukhrani itself became the scene of a major confrontation in which King Simon I of Kartli inflicted defeat on the invading Ottoman army.

War and death 
In 1609, Teimuraz was in person present at the battle of Tashiskari, in which the Kartlians under Giorgi Saakadze annihilated an Ottoman-allied Crimean Tatar force, saving the young king Luarsab II of Kartli. After the Safavid shah Abbas I militarily subjugated eastern Georgia in 1615, a succession of puppet Muslim rulers was installed to rule Kartli, but their authority was shaky in the areas other than the heavily Iranian-garrisoned capital, Tbilisi, and the districts of Lower Kartli. That vacuum of power was temporarily filled by the nobility of Kartli by appointing Teimuraz as regent in 1623. In 1625, Teimuraz joined an uprising against the Safavid hegemony led by Giorgi Saakadze. Shah Abbas dispatched a large punitive army which clashed with the united forces of Kartlians and Kakhetians at Marabda on 1 July 1625. According to the 18th-century chronicler Prince Vakhushti, Teimuraz was killed while gallantly fighting the enemy. A word spread out that the fallen Teimuraz was King Teimuraz I of Kakheti, turning the Georgians into flight and their initial success into a rout.

Marriage and children 
Teimuraz I married Ana (died 1624), daughter of Nugzar, Duke of Aragvi of the House of Sidamoni. They had six children:
 Vakhtang V (1618–1675), adopted son of King Rostom and his successor to the throne of Kartli.
 Constantine I (fl. 1622 – 1667), Prince of Mukhrani.
 Archil (fl. 1637).
 Erakle (fl. 1676).
 Davit (fl. 1631).
 Luarsab (died 1629).
 Darejan, who was married to Prince Kaikhosro Baratashvili, a high courtier killed on the order of King Rostom in 1647.

References

1572 births
1625 deaths
House of Mukhrani
Regents of Georgia
16th-century people from Georgia (country)
17th-century people from Georgia (country)